Charles Allen Prosser School of Technology (Prosser) is a vocational school in New Albany, Indiana. The school was named in honor of New Albany native Charles Allen Prosser, the "Father of Vocational Education" in the United States.

Courses

Prosser offers a diverse set of vocational classes including from Culinary Arts, Computers Operations, Auto-body Repair, HVAC Technicians, airplane mechanics, and electrician classes among many others.

The school serves all public and private high school students of south central Indiana including the following school districts: Austin, Charlestown, Jeffersonville, Corydon Central, Crawford County, Eastern, Floyd Central, Christian Academy, Jeffersonville, Lanesville, New Albany, New Washington, North Harrison, Providence, Rock Creek Christian Academy, Salem, Pittsburgh, Shiloh Holiness, Silver Creek, South Central, Henryville, Borden and West Washington High Schools. Any student from these schools can choose Prosser's courses as electives in their junior and senior school years.

Prosser also offer some adult education courses. After completion, Prosser helps the students to find jobs in their field of study.

Students attending Prosser can convert their classes to college credit using agreements setup between Prosser and the following colleges:

 Indiana University Southeast
 Vincennes University
 Indiana State University
 Ivy Tech Community College
 Oakland City University
 Purdue University Statewide Technology
 Sullivan University
 Spencerian College
 Louisville Technical Institute
 Murray State University
 Eastern Kentucky University

References

External links
Prosser School of Technology website

Vocational schools in Indiana
Schools in Floyd County, Indiana
Public high schools in Indiana
Buildings and structures in New Albany, Indiana